Stolpe auf Usedom  is a municipality in the Vorpommern-Greifswald district, in Mecklenburg-Vorpommern, Germany.

References

External links

Official website of Stolpe auf Usedom (German)

Populated coastal places in Germany (Baltic Sea)
Vorpommern-Greifswald